Guanghai is a town in Taishan Prefecture in Guangdong, China.

External links
 Interactive China province map with city guides and more.
 Scenes of Guanghai Town
 Map of Guanghai Town

Towns in Guangdong
Taishan, Guangdong